Tomorrow We Live (released as At Dawn We Die in the US), is a 1943 British film directed by George King and starring John Clements, Godfrey Tearle, Greta Gynt, Hugh Sinclair and Yvonne Arnaud.

The film was made during the Second World War, and the action is set in a small town in German-occupied France. It portrays the activities of members of the French Resistance and the Germans' tactic of taking and shooting innocent hostages in reprisal for acts of sabotage. The opening credits acknowledge "the official co-operation of General de Gaulle and the French National Committee".

Dorothy Hope is credited with "original story".

Plot
A young French idealist (John Clements), who gives his name as Jean Baptiste, arrives in "St Pierre-le-Port", a small town near Saint-Nazaire, a major port and base of operations for the Kriegsmarine, particularly their U-boats, on the Atlantic coast. Baptiste tells a member of the French Resistance that "I come from Saint-Nazaire. I've details of the submarine base, the docks and power plant. If I can get them to England..."

The first half of the film often has a lighthearted tone; the Germans are portrayed as bumbling and easily outwitted. The German commandant is overweight and gullible.  However, after the Resistance successfully sabotages a German armaments train, the SS take charge of the town, and the occupation takes a brutal turn.

Main cast

John Clements as Jean Baptiste
Godfrey Tearle as Mayor Pierre DuSchen
Hugh Sinclair as Major von Kleist
Greta Gynt as Marie DuSchen
Judy Kelly as Germaine Bertan
Yvonne Arnaud as Madame L. Labouche
Karel Stepanek as Seitz
Bransby Williams as Matthieu
Fritz Wendhausen as Commandant Frissette
Allan Jeayes as Pogo
Gabrielle Brune as Madame Frissette
Margaret Yarde as Fauntel
David Keir as Jacquier
Anthony Holles as Stationmaster
Olaf Olsen as Sergeant Major
D.J. Williams as Boileau
John Salew as Marcel La Blanc
Walter Gotell as Hans
Victor Beaumont as Rabineau
Brefni O'Rorke as Moreau
Gibb McLaughlin as Dupont
 Cot D'Ordan as Durand
 Walter Hertner as Schultz
Herbert Lom as Kurtz
 Townsend Whitling as Rougemont

Music
Nicholas Brodzsky is credited for the music, while the orchestration is credited to Roy Douglas, an English composer who was much in demand as an arranger, orchestrator, and copyist of the music of others, notably Richard Addinsell, Ralph Vaughan Williams and William Walton. However it is possible that Brodzsky actually contributed very little. In a memoir in the William Walton Archive, Roy Douglas claimed, "Brodsky was a so-called composer: I had actually composed entire film scores for him, which went under his name". In a letter to Roy Douglas dated 23 December 1943, William Walton wrote, "I'm delighted about your picture. I'll have a good deal to tell you about Brodsky when I see you. In my capacity as music adviser to Two Cities [a film company] it is going to be my duty to have to tick him off!"

References
Notes

Bibliography

 Aldgate, Anthony and Richards, Jeffrey. Britain Can Take it: British Cinema in the Second World War. Edinburgh: Edinburgh University Press, 2nd Edition. 1994. .
 Barr, Charles, ed. All Our Yesterdays: 90 Years of British Cinema. London: British Film Institute, 1986. .
 Murphy, Robert. British Cinema and the Second World War. London: Continuum, 2000. .

External links
 
 

1943 films
British black-and-white films
Films directed by George King
World War II films made in wartime
Films about the French Resistance
1940s English-language films